The 1994 Bradford South by-election was a by-election held in England on 9 June 1994 for the House of Commons constituency of Bradford South in West Yorkshire.

The seat had become vacant on the death in a car accident on 12 April of the Labour Member of Parliament (MP) Bob Cryer, who had represented the constituency since the 1987 general election.

The Labour candidate, Gerry Sutcliffe, held the seat for his party with a much increased majority.

Votes

See also
Bradford South (UK Parliament constituency)
1949 Bradford South by-election
List of United Kingdom by-elections

References 

 The Guardian: election results
 Richard Kimber's Political Science Resources: UK General Elections since 1832 
 

1994 in England
1994 elections in the United Kingdom
By-elections to the Parliament of the United Kingdom in Bradford constituencies
1990s in West Yorkshire
June 1994 events in the United Kingdom